Charles Bateman Robert Fetherstonhaugh (born 17 November 1932) is a former English cricketer.  Fetherstonhaugh was a right-handed batsman and a wicket-keeper.  He was born in Tavistock, Devon and educated at Bradfield College, Berkshire.

Fetherstonhaugh made his Minor Counties Championship debut for Devon against Oxfordshire in 1953.  From 1953 to 1963, he represented the county in 31 Championship matches, the last of which came against Berkshire.  In 1956, he played his only first-class match for the Marylebone Cricket Club against Ireland.  He later played three first-class matches for the Free Foresters between 1962 and 1964, with his appearances coming twice against Oxford University and once against Cambridge University.  In total Fetherstonhaugh played four first-class matches, in which he scored 59 runs at a batting average of 9.83, with a high score of 20*.  Behind the stumps he took 4 catches and made a single stumping.

His uncle, Henry, played first-class cricket for Leicestershire and Northamptonshire.  Another uncle, John, played first-class cricket for Leicestershire.

References

External links
Robert Fetherstonhaugh at Cricinfo
Robert Fetherstonhaugh at CricketArchive

1932 births
Living people
Sportspeople from Tavistock
People educated at Bradfield College
English cricketers
Marylebone Cricket Club cricketers
Devon cricketers
Free Foresters cricketers
Wicket-keepers